Edayarikapuzha is a small village located in Kangazha Panchayat of Kottayam district, Kerala state, India.

Economy
The majority of the people are farmers whose main income comes from rubber plantations. Another major income source is cattle farming. Edayarikapuzha junction is located on the Manimala-Changanacherry road between Pathanadu and Manimala.

History
Edayaricapuzha was one of the oldest commercial centers in Kangazha Panchayat. People from nearby villages came to this market for selling and purchasing goods. Now the market is in a bad condition.

Landmarks
The main institutions close to Edayaricapuzha are the following; 
 Kangazha Cooperative Society
 Grmaswaraj Public Library
 Uma Maheswar Temple
 Post Office 
 Muneerul Islam Mosque 
 Market 
 Vivekanda Vidhyamandiram
 Primary Health Center Edayaricapuzha 
 NSS Karayooga Mandiram.

Etymology
The name Edayaricapuzha is composed of three parts, namely Eada, Erika and Puzha means a resting place near to a small river (Thodu or Puzha). We can see harmony among people, most of them are well educated and well placed. The nearest Hospital is Kangazha Hospital. Even though it is relatively a small village, all kinds of facilities like hotels to laboratories are available at the doorstep.

References

Villages in Kottayam district